Ruine Diepoldsburg is a ruined castle nearby the community of Lenningen, Baden-Württemberg, Germany.

References
 Friedrich-Wilhelm Krahe: Burgen des deutschen Mittelalters – Grundriss-Lexikon. Sonderausgabe, Flechsig Verlag, Würzburg 2000, S. 147.
 Günter Schmitt: Burgenführer Schwäbische Alb, Band 4 – Alb Mitte-Nord: Wandern und entdecken zwischen Aichelberg und Reutlingen. Biberacher Verlagsdruckerei, Biberach an der Riß 1991, S. 109–118.
 Wilhelm Gradmann: Burgen und Schlösser der Schwäbischen Alb. Stuttgart: DRW-Verlag, 1983, .

Ruined castles in Germany